Firehouse, Engine Company 31 is a historic fire station located at 87 Lafayette Street between Walker and White Streets in the Civic Center neighborhood of Manhattan, New York City. It was built in 1895 and designed by architects Napoleon LeBrun & Sons, who styled it after an early-16th-century chateau in the Loire Valley of France.

The building was designated a New York City Landmark in 1966 and added to the National Register of Historic Places in 1972. The New York City Fire Department vacated the building in November 1972, and it is currently occupied by the Downtown Community Television Center (DCTV).

See also
National Register of Historic Places listings in Manhattan below 14th Street
List of New York City Designated Landmarks in Manhattan below 14th Street

References
Notes

External links 

Government buildings on the National Register of Historic Places in Manhattan
New York City Designated Landmarks in Manhattan
Fire stations on the National Register of Historic Places in New York (state)
Fire stations completed in 1895
Fire stations in New York City
Defunct fire stations in New York (state)
1895 establishments in New York City